Steven Lee Connelly (born April 27, 1974) is an American former professional baseball pitcher and the current pitching coach for the Las Vegas Aviators, the Triple-A affiliate of Oakland Athletics. He played for the Oakland Athletics of Major League Baseball during the  season.

Early life
Connelly was born in Long Beach, California and graduated from Woodrow Wilson High School.  Upon graduation Connelly was drafted by the Pittsburgh Pirates but chose instead to attend the University of Oklahoma where he helped contribute to the 1994 National Championship team. In 1994, he played collegiate summer baseball with the Yarmouth–Dennis Red Sox of the Cape Cod Baseball League.

Playing career
Steve Connelly was drafted in the 24th round by the Oakland Athletics in the 1995 amateur draft, Connelly spent 4 years within the Oakland organization.  Placed on waivers after the 1998 season, Connelly spent the next 5 seasons within the San Francisco Giants' organization before ending a 9-year professional career.

Coaching career
In 2014, Connelly began his coaching career with the Vermont Lake Monsters. In 2015, he coached the Beloit Snappers. In 2016, Connelly was named as the pitching coach for the Stockton Ports. He was promoted to the Midland RockHounds for the 2018 season.

References

External links

1974 births
Living people
American expatriate baseball players in Canada
Baseball coaches from California
Baseball players from Long Beach, California
Edmonton Trappers players
Fresno Grizzlies players
Huntsville Stars players
Major League Baseball pitchers
Minor league baseball coaches
Modesto A's players
Oakland Athletics players
Oklahoma Sooners baseball players
Southern Oregon A's players
Sportspeople from Long Beach, California
Yarmouth–Dennis Red Sox players